Dóra Dúró (born 5 March 1987) is a Hungarian politician of the Our Homeland Movement, formerly spokesperson of the far-right nationalist political party Jobbik.

After the 2010 elections, she was elected to the National Assembly of Hungary. Assuming office at the age of 23, she was the youngest member of the Országgyűlés until 2018. Her husband is Előd Novák, the former deputy leader of Jobbik.

In 2018, after her expulsion from Jobbik, she joined László Toroczkai's new party Our Home Movement and became the party's single MP.

Personal life
In 2008, Dúró married fellow politician Előd Novák in the Church of Our Lady of the Hungarians in Gellért Hill Cave. They have a daughter, Hunóra Kincső, and three sons, Bottyán János, Nimród Nándor and Zente Levente.

Life

She was born in Szentes. Her father was a veterinarian  and her mother was a housewife. She studied in Csépa, Döbrököz and Dombóvár. She graduated from the Illyés Gyula Grammar School in Dombóvár in 2005 and later studied political science at the Faculty of Law of the University of Budapest, where she received a doctorate degree. She speaks English and German on intermediate levels and Italian on a conversational level.

Book shredding
In September, 2020, the politician said that the book titled Meseország mindenkié (Fairytaleland is for Everyone) is "homosexual propaganda". She tore out sheets and then shredded it in a paper shredder. Many public figures criticized her action, and the Magyar Könyvkiadók és Könyvterjesztők Egyesülése (Association of Hungarian Publishers and Distributors) stated in a communication: "communion with the legacy of Nazi bookbinders and communist book shreds."

References

External links
Biography on jobbik.hu 
Dúró Dóra | Jobbik.hu Latest edition of Biography in Hungarian language.

1987 births
Living people
Hungarian political scientists
Far-right politics in Hungary
Women members of the National Assembly of Hungary
Jobbik politicians
Our Homeland Movement politicians
Members of the National Assembly of Hungary (2010–2014)
Members of the National Assembly of Hungary (2014–2018)
Members of the National Assembly of Hungary (2018–2022)
Members of the National Assembly of Hungary (2022–2026)
People from Szentes
Women political scientists
21st-century Hungarian women politicians